The Firesteel River is the uppermost left tributary of the Finlay River in the Northern Interior of British Columbia, Canada.  The river originates at Tatlatui Lake, while the Finlay originates at the outlet of Thutade Lake, to the southeast, which is considered the ultimate source of the Mackenzie River.

See also
Tatlatui Range
Tatlatui Provincial Park
List of British Columbia rivers

References

Rivers of the Omineca Mountains